Weedonville is an unincorporated community in King George County, Virginia, United States.

Cleydael, located near Weedonville, was listed on the National Register of Historic Places in 1986.

References

Unincorporated communities in Virginia
Unincorporated communities in King George County, Virginia